Playas Lake is a dry lake or playa in Hidalgo County, New Mexico, United States. It consists of a long dry lake running north northwest south southeast within the Playas Valley between the Animas Mountains on the west and the Little Hatchet Mountains on the east.

History
From November 1846 to the early 1850s Cooke's Wagon Road crossed Playas Lake to Whitmire Spring from the northeast.  Later from the early 1880s, Whitmire Spring was the site of the Whitmire Ranch.

References

Bodies of water of Hidalgo County, New Mexico
Lakes of New Mexico
Cooke's Wagon Road
History of Hidalgo County, New Mexico